The 2006 Pacific Life Pacific-10 Conference men's basketball tournament was played between March 8 and March 11, 2006, at Staples Center in Los Angeles, California.  The champion of the tournament was UCLA, which received the Pac-10's automatic bid to the NCAA tournament.  The Most Outstanding Player was Harish Ganesan of California.

Seeds

All Pacific-10 schools play in the tournament.  Teams are seeded by conference record, with a tiebreaker system used to seed teams with identical conference records.

Bracket

 ** Double Overtime

Tournament Notes
 This was the first tournament in 3 years in which the top two seeds didn't play in the final game.
 UCLA's 19-point margin of victory over Cal (71-52) is one of the largest in this tournament's history for the championship game.
 California had someone selected for the All Tournament team for the first time. Two players were in fact selected.
 Leon Powe of Cal made a record total 30 free throws for a single Pac-10/12 tournament (30-of-41, 3 games). This record still stands.
 Leon Powe's 41 FT attempts for those games is also a tournament record.

All tournament team

 Leon Powe, California – Tournament MVP
 Brandon Roy, Washington
 Chamberlain Oguchi, Oregon
 Ayinde Ubaka, California
 Jordan Farmar, UCLA
 Arron Afflalo, UCLA

References

2007–08 Pac-10 Men's Basketball Media Guide pages 50–60 (PDF copy available at 2007–08 Pac-10 Men's Basketball Media Guide)

2005–06 Pacific-10 Conference men's basketball season
Pac-12 Conference men's basketball tournament